Daryl Harpe (born August 12, 1966) is a Canadian former professional ice hockey player.

From 1983 to 1986, Harpe played junior hockey, and is the all-time leading scorer, for the now defunct Hobbema Hawks of the Alberta Junior Hockey League (AJHL).

Harpe played 182 regular season games and 15 playoff games in the East Coast Hockey League (ECHL) with the Erie Panthers , Cincinnati Cyclones, and Knoxville Cherokees. During the inaugural 1988–89 ECHL season, Harpe scored 34 goals and 86 assists with the Erie Panthers to lead the ECHL with 122 points. He was selected the ECHL Most Valuable Player and named to the 1988–89 All-ECHL Team.

Awards and honours

References

External links

1966 births
Living people
Hobbema Hawks players
Canadian ice hockey forwards
Cincinnati Cyclones (ECHL) players
Erie Golden Blades players
Erie Panthers players
Ice hockey people from Alberta
Knoxville Cherokees players
People from Fort McMurray